Aleksanteri (Santeri) Mäkelä (26 March 1870, in Vimpeli – 1938) was a Finnish smallholder, writer and politician. He immigrated to the United States in 1899 and returned to Finland in 1907. Mäkelä was a member of the Parliament of Finland from 1910 to 1914 and again from 1917 to 1918, representing the Social Democratic Party of Finland. During the Finnish Civil War, he worked in the administration of Red Finland. When the Red side lost the war, he fled to Soviet Russia and joined the Communist Party of Finland (SKP), which was founded by Finnish political refugees on 29 August 1918 in Moscow. He settled in the Soviet Union for the rest of his life, working as a propagandist, as a journalist, as a teacher and in other functions. Mäkelä probably died in prison custody in the Soviet Union in 1938.

References

1870 births
1938 deaths
People from Vimpeli
People from Vaasa Province (Grand Duchy of Finland)
Social Democratic Party of Finland politicians
Communist Party of Finland politicians
Members of the Parliament of Finland (1910–11)
Members of the Parliament of Finland (1911–13)
Members of the Parliament of Finland (1917–19)
People of the Finnish Civil War (Red side)
Finnish writers
Writers from South Ostrobothnia
Finnish emigrants to Russia
Finnish emigrants to the United States (1809–1917)
Finnish expatriates in the Soviet Union
Finnish people who died in prison custody
Finnish refugees
Prisoners who died in Soviet detention
Refugees in Russia